The Women's C1 at the 2021 ICF Canoe Slalom World Championships took place on 23 and 26 September 2021 at the Čunovo Water Sports Centre in Bratislava. It was the 9th official edition of the event, after it made its debut in 2010. 44 athletes from 22 nations competed.

The event was won by Elena Apel of Germany, securing her second medal of the Championships after she won silver in K1. Briton Mallory Franklin won silver for the fourth time, her fifth ever medal in this event. 2020 European Champion Gabriela Satková of the Czech Republic won bronze, her first individual medal at world championship level.

Background
Andrea Herzog of Germany entered the event as the reigning world champion, having taken the title in 2019 in La Seu d'Urgell. This was the first World Championships since women's C1 made its Olympic debut at Tokyo, where Jess Fox won gold ahead of Mallory Franklin and Herzog. Czech Tereza Fišerová came into the event having taken her first World Cup overall title after winning the final round in Pau. All four were favourites for the title as the highest ranked athletes by the ICF.

Competition format
The women's C1 event in canoe slalom uses a three-round format with heats, a semifinal and final. Athletes complete up to two runs in the heats. In the first heat, the 20 fastest women qualify automatically for the semifinal, whilst the rest complete another run in the repêchage second heat for a further 10 qualification positions. The final rank of non-qualifying athletes is determined by their second run score. Athletes start in the reverse order of their heats position in the semifinal and complete a single run, with the top 10 advancing to the final. The athlete with the best time in the single-run final is awarded gold.

Penalties of 2 or 50 seconds are incurred for infractions such as missing a gate, touching a gate, or not negotiating gates in numerical order. A team may request up to one review of a penalty per boat in the heats or semifinals phases, with no enquiries considered in the finals.

Schedule
All times are Central European Summer Time (UTC+2)

Results
Kimberley Woods set the fastest time in the first heat with a penalty-free 92.11. This was particularly significant, given she had been in a wheelchair a week earlier, following a car accident. Fellow countrywoman Mallory Franklin set the second fastest time, ahead of Australian Jessica Fox. World No. 5 Ana Sátila did not qualify directly to the semifinal after receiving a 50 second penalty but set the second fastest time of the day to win the second heat.

The Russian Canoe Federation's Alsu Minazova topped the semifinal with a time of 103.55 ahead of Angèle Hug of France. In an upset semifinal on a difficult course, Olympic Champion Fox, European Champion Miren Lazkano, World Cup overall winner Tereza Fišerová and reigning World Champion Andrea Herzog were all eliminated - the first two after incurring 50 second penalties. Fox' penalty meant that she would leave the World Championships without a medal in a canoe slalom event for the first time since 2011 and without making a final for the first time in her entire career.

Elena Apel of Germany backed up her silver medal in K1 by becoming the 2021 C1W World Champion in a time of 99.03, including a 2 second penalty. Olympic silver-medallist Franklin won silver, whilst 2020 European Champion Gabriela Satková took bronze. In a marked difference to the semifinal where just three athletes completed clean runs, only two athletes took penalties, including Apel. 

Penalties are included in the time shown. The fastest time in each round is shown in bold.

References

ICF Canoe Slalom World Championships
World Championships
ICF
International sports competitions hosted by Slovakia
Sport in Bratislava
Canoeing in Slovakia
ICF